Senator Head may refer to:

John W. Head (1822–1874), Tennessee State Senate
Nathaniel Head (1828–1883), New Hampshire State Senate
Orson S. Head (1817–1875), Wisconsin State Senate
Randall Head (born 1968), member of the Indiana Senate